British official war artists were a select group of artists who were employed on contract, or commissioned to produce specific works during the First World War, the Second World War and select military actions in the post-war period.  Official war artists have been appointed by governments for information or propaganda purposes and to record events on the battlefield; but there are many other types of war artist.

A war artist will have depicted some aspect of war through art; this might be a pictorial record or it might commemorate how war shapes lives. A war artist creates a visual account of war by showing its impact as men and women are shown waiting, preparing, fighting, suffering and celebrating.

The works produced by war artists illustrate and record many aspects of war, and the individual's experience of war, whether allied or enemy, service or civilian, military or political, social or cultural. The rôle of the artist and his or her work embraces the causes, course and consequences of conflict and it has an essentially educational purpose.

First World War

Throughout the early years of the First World War, the British Government did not support an official war artist scheme. This began to change after artists who had served on the Western Front, such as Paul Nash and Christopher R. W. Nevinson exhibited paintings based on their experiences in France. The public acclaim that Eric Kennington received when his painting The Kensingtons at Laventie was first exhibited in London in April 1916 prompted Charles Masterman, head of the British War Propaganda Bureau, acting on the advice of William Rothenstein, to appoint Muirhead Bone as Britain's first official war artist in May 1916. After Bone returned to England he was replaced by his brother-in-law, Francis Dodd, who had been working for the Manchester Guardian. In 1917 arrangements were made to send other artists to France including Kennington, Nash, Nevinson, William Orpen and William Rothenstein. John Lavery and others were recruited to paint pictures of the home front.

Early in 1918, responsibility for the British war artists was passed to the British War Memorials Committee, BWMC, when the Department of Information became the Ministry of Information with Lord Beaverbrook as its Minister. Rather than focus on short-term propaganda, the main aim of the BMWC was to create a lasting memorial to the war in the form of a national Hall of Remembrance. To this end younger artists, including Stanley Spencer and Wyndham Lewis,  were commissioned by the BWMC to produce a series of large artworks, After the War, when the BWMC was wound up, this series of artworks, which included The Menin Road by Paul Nash and Gassed by John Singer Sargent, became part of the Imperial War Museum collection.

Second World War
The British War Advisory Scheme (WAS) was administered by the War Artists' Advisory Committee, WAAC, of the Ministry of Information. The project was devised and run by Kenneth Clark, Director of the National Gallery. When the committee was dissolved in December 1945 its collection consisted of 5,570 works of art produced by over four hundred artists, who had been employed on either full-time contracts, short-term contracts or commissions for individual works.

Selected artists

First World War

Anna Airy (1882–1964)
David Bomberg (1890–1957).
Muirhead Bone, 1876–1953.
Frank Brangwyn, 1867–1956.
Philip Connard, 1875–1958.
George Clausen, 1852–1944.
Olive Edis, 1876–1955.
Colin Gill, 1892–1940.
Adrian Hill, 1895–1977.
Francis Ernest Jackson, 1872–1945
Augustus John, 1878–1961.
Eric Kennington RA, 1888–1960.
Wyndham Lewis, 1882–1957.
John Hodgson Lobley, 1878–1954.
Fortunino Matania
John Nash, 1893–1977.
Paul Nash, 1889–1946.
Christopher R. W. Nevinson
Herbert Arnould Olivier, 1861–1952.
Sir William Orpen RA, 1878–1931;
Charles Snaffles Johnson Payne (1884–1967);
Gerald Spencer Pryse, 1882–1956.
William Rothenstein, 1872–1945.
Austin Spare, 1886–1956.
Sir Stanley Spencer RA, 1891–1959.
Leonard Campbell Taylor, 1874–1969

Second World War

 Edward Ardizzone CBE RA, 1900–1979.
 Edward Bawden RA, 1903–1989.
 Stephen Bone 1904–1958 
 David Bomberg 1890–1957 
 Henry Carr RA, 1894–1970
 Leslie Cole, 1910–1976
 Charles Cundall, 1890–1971
 Evelyn Mary Dunbar
 Richard Eurich, 1903-1989.
 Barnett Freedman
 Ethel Gabain, 1882–1950
 Charles Ginner
 Duncan Grant, 1885–1978
 Thomas Hennell, 1903–1945
 Eliot Hodgkin, 1905–1987
 Eric Kennington, RA, 1888–1960. 
 Mary Kessell, 1914–1977.
 Laura Knight DBE RA, 1877–1970.
 L. S. Lowry
 John Mansbridge, 1901–1981
 Henry Moore
 James Morris
 Paul Nash, 1889–1946.
 Mervyn Peake, 1911–1968
 John Piper
 Roland Vivian Pitchforth, 1895–1982
 Eric Ravilious, 1903–1942
 Albert Richards, 1919–1945
 Leonard Rosoman RA, 1913–2012 
 Alan Sorrell, 1904–1974.
 Ruskin Spear RA, 1911–1990
 Stanley Spencer RA, 1891–1959.
 Graham Sutherland OM, 1903–1980
 Carel Weight CBE RA, 1908–1997
 Doris Zinkeisen, 1898–1991
 Anna Zinkeisen, 1901–1976

Conflicts since the Second World War 
Since the First World War and the Imperial War Museums' establishment of a national collection of Official War Art, the IWM has played a major role in Official War Artist commissioning. In the early 1970s, for the first time since the Second World War and the WAAC scheme, the IWM revived official commissioning with the establishment of the Art Commissions Committee (ACC) and by sending Ken Howard (artist) to cover the Troubles in Northern Ireland. This was soon followed by Linda Kitson's commission for the Falklands conflict, and has continued with many later projects, including Peter Howson's work in Bosnia and more recently Steve McQueen (director)'s work in Iraq, among others. Today the IWM's commissioning relates to all aspects of British and Commonwealth Forces' activities. Furthermore, not all commissioned artists are embedded within the military, some working with non-governmental organisations or independently.

IWM official war artists since 1979
Derek Eland, born 1961 (Afghanistan 2011)
Mark Neville, born 1966 (Afghanistan 2011; commission by firstsite, Colchester, in association with the IWM)
Steve McQueen (director) (Iraq, 2004–6)
Langlands & Bell (Afghanistan, 2003)
Paul Seawright (Afghanistan, 2002)
Peter Howson, born 1958 (Bosnia)
John Keane, born 1954 (Gulf War)
Linda Kitson, born 1945 (Falklands War)
Ken Howard (artist) (Northern Ireland, 1979)

Other war artists' schemes 

Working with the British Government and the Armed Forces, traditionally the Official War Artists' schemes have been overseen by artists (including Muirhead Bone) and art historians (including Kenneth Clark and curators from the Imperial War Museums). Yet so too have the British Armed Forces discretely appointed their own war artists to represent operations on the Home Front and in conflicts abroad, whose commissions have been vitally important for keeping an up-to-date artist's impression and record of contemporary warfare.

During the Second World War, for example, the RAF commissioned artists to make portraits of its personnel, including Battle of Britain pilots, as well as of the machinery of war – the aircraft – not with the War Artists' Advisory Committee, but independently through the Air Ministry, using a distinct RAF fund. Away from Kenneth Clark's purview (and to his annoyance), this enabled the RAF freedom to choose artists and subjects they felt celebrated their achievements and priorities. Cuthbert Orde and William Rothenstein, among others, were commissioned under this scheme to produce portraits – a genre Kenneth Clark did not much rate as a strength in British painting at that time (although with the WAAC he had commissioned Eric Kennington to produce portrait pastels for the Air Ministry as Official War Artist).

During the Second World War there were many kinds of 'war artist', besides those officially commissioned through the WAAC – such as the Firemen Artists and the Civil Defence Artists, who exhibited regularly at the Royal Academy of Arts and elsewhere in London. Women artists, furthermore, were largely overlooked for WAAC commissions, comprising around 13 percent of all artists commissioned in the Second World War, while those who received commissions, including Laura Knight, mostly worked to short-term contracts. War subjects by women artists were nonetheless exhibited and collected throughout the war, and a number were selectively purchased by the WAAC, even if not commissioned. Largely, 'women's subjects' concerned the war effort, including nursing, their work as members of the Women's Auxiliary Air Force, or as Air Raid Precautions wardens, and a number of female artists depicted ruin scenes of the Blitz. Today such works are celebrated as important examples of British war art.

Works by artists outside of official commissioning schemes have been purchased for the nation as records of modern conflict, and these are wide-ranging and insightful, shedding light on a broader range of perspectives, including those of Service personnel who make art, and of emigre or refugee artists.

Today artists work with the British Armed Forces to ensure contemporary conflicts are covered – maintaining the tradition of the artist's record – while museums continue both to commission and purchase war art for the nation.

Armed Forces and independent war artists 
 Cuthbert Orde (Second World War, RAF commission)
 William Rothenstein (Second World War, RAF commission)
 Frank Wootton (artist) (Second World War, RAF / RCAF commission)
 David Rowlands (Bosnia, Kosovo, Iraq, Afghanistan)
 Alixandra Fazzina (Bosnia, 1995; Army commission)
 Matthew Cook (Afghanistan, 2006-9 – 'Times Official War Artist')
 Jules George (Afghanistan, 2010, Ministry of Defence posted with the Army)

See also
 Military art
 Norman Wilkinson (artist)
 War artist
 War photography

References 

 McCloskey, Barbara. (2005).  Artists of World War II. Westport: Greenwood Press. ;

Further reading
 Gallatin, Albert Eugene. Art and the Great War. (New York: E.P. Dutton, 1919).
 Harrington, Peter. British Artists and War: The Face of Battle in Paintings and Prints, 1700–1914. (London: Greenhill, 1993). 
 Haycock, David Boyd. "A Crisis of Brilliance: Five Young British Artists and the Great War". (London: Old Street Publishing).
 Hichberger, J.W.M. (1988). Images of the Army: The Military in British Art 1815–1914. Manchester: University Press.
 Knott, Richard, The Sketchbook War. The History Press, 2013.
 Sillars, Stuart (1987). Art and Survival in First World War Britain. Basingstoke: Macmillan.
Holme, Charles. The war depicted by distinguished British artists (The Studio Ltd., 1918).

External links
 Ministry of Defence (UK) (MOD),  MOD art collection, war artists
 National Archives (UK)The Art of War at The National Archives
 Imperial War Museum Collections, many examples of the work of British war artists can be found online here.

 
Military of the United Kingdom
Lists of war artists